Kubera Theevu is a 1963 Indian Tamil language film directed by G. Viswanathan. The film featured C. L. Anandan, Devika, Nagesh and Pandari Bai in the main roles.

Plot synopsis
After a gang of thieves attacks their family and tragically separates them from their mother, two young boys are raised by the most unlikely guardians.

Cast 
The list is adapted from the book Thiraikalanjiyam Part 2.

Male cast
C. L. Anandan
Nagesh
S. A. Ashokan
Rama Rao

Female cast
Devika
Rajasree
Pandari Bai
Rajahs
Manorama

Guest artistes
V. Nagayya
S. A. Natarajan
Rajanala

Production 
The film was produced by Nalam Seshu Kanchana under the banner Nithyakalyani Films and was directed by G. Viswanathan. Maa. Raa. wrote the story and dialogues.

Soundtrack 
Music was composed by C. N. Pandurangan and the lyrics were penned by Kannadasan, Kambadasan, Villiputhan, Veppathur Krishnan and Thiruchi Thiyagarajan. The song "Ilam Kanni" is based on "Aai Aai Aa Suku Suku" from the Hindi film Junglee.

Notes

References

External links 
 

1960s Tamil-language films
Films scored by C. N. Pandurangan